The Confederated Tribes of Siletz Indians in the United States is a federally recognized confederation of more than 27 Native American tribes and bands who once inhabited an extensive homeland of more than 20 million acres from northern California to southwest Washington and between the summit of the Cascades and the Pacific Ocean. After the Rogue River Wars, these tribes were removed to the Coast Indian Reservation, now known as the Siletz Reservation. The tribes spoke at least 11 distinct languages, including Tillamook, Shasta, Lower Chinook, Kalapuya, Takelma, Alsea-Yaquina, Siuslaw/Lower Umpqua, Coos, the Plateau Penutian languages Molala and Klickitat, and several related Oregon Athabaskan languages.

Name
The confederation takes its name from the Siletz River, which surrounds the original headquarters of the reservation. The word siletz translates to a description of something that is coiled like a rope or a snake, describing the route of the river winding through the mountains circuitously to the ocean. The confederation includes remnants of the Siletz, a Coast Salish people who also became incorporated into the larger confederation.

Tribes
The confederation is made up of the following tribes and bands.

 Tillamook
Siletz
Salmon River/Neachesna
Nestucca
Nehalem
Tillamook Bay
Alsea, including Yaquina
Chinook, including Wakhiakum, Multnomah, and Clatsop
Coos, including Hanis and Miluk
Kalapuya, including Santiam, Tualatin, Yamhill, Yoncalla, Marys River band, and others
Lower Umpqua (also known as Kuitsh) and Siuslaw
 Molalla
 Shasta, including Klamath River people
 Rogue River peoples, including Shasta, Upper Rogue River Athapaskan peoples: Applegate and Galice Creek, or any of the tribes of Lower Rogue River Athapaskan (or Tututni) people
 Klickitat
 Takelma, including Dagelma, Latgawa, and Cow Creek
 Oregon Athabaskans, including all Athabaskan bands from southwestern Oregon (bands of Rogue River Athabaskan peoples, Chetco people, Tolowa people and Upper Umpqua (Etnemitane) people), such as the following:
Lower Rogue River Athabaskan (also known as Tututni) peoples
Upper Coquille (also known as Mishikwutinetunne)
Chasta Costa
Tututni
Euchre Creek (also known as Yukichetunne)
Flores Creek
Mikonotunne
Naltunnetunne
Pistol River (also known as Chetleshin)
Port Orford band of Kwatami (also known as Kaltsergheatunne)
Sixes (also known as Kwatami)
Yashute (also known as Chemetunne) and others
Upper Rogue River Athabaskan (also known as Galice/Applegate) peoples
Applegate River (also known as Dakubetede)
Galice Creek (also known as Taltushtuntede)
Chetco-Tolowa
Tolowa
Chetco
Upper Umpqua (also known as Etnemitane)

History 
The Confederated Tribes emerged from the remnants of around 28 different tribes of coastal and other Western Oregon Indians.

Interim-reservations
Table Rock Indian Reservation

After the war of 1855–1856
After the Rogue River Wars of 1855–56, most of the peoples were forced onto the Coast Indian Reservation, which later became known as the Siletz Reservation, where they were to form a single unified tribe. The Coast Reservation originally comprised 1.1 million acres, which was established by the executive order of President Franklin Pierce on November 9, 1855, only weeks after the start of the last phase of the Rogue River Wars. The Siletz Reservation was reduced by around 3/4 its area (approximately 900,000 acres) in 1865 and 1875 in violation of treaties. In 1894, 551 individuals received federal allotments from the remaining reservation, and tribal members were forced to cede the "surplus" for 74 cents an acre. By 1912, restrictions on inheriting lands within families led to more than one half of the Siletz allotments being owned by non-Indians.

Termination act of 1954
The Western Oregon Indian Termination Act of 1954, Public Law 588, was passed into law on August 13, 1954. This new law severed Bureau of Indian Affairs (BIA) supervision of trust lands and BIA regulation of services to the Indian peoples.

All of the remaining Siletz lands were sold except for the 39 acres called Government Hill.  The proceeds of the sale of the timberland property were distributed to enrolled tribal members in two installments: $250 per person in December 1954, and a final payment of $542.50 per person in August 1956. Other inherited allotments were held in trusts but were also sold off at the request of the owners.

Restoration bills
During the 1960s, several members of the Siletz tribe began to organize and restore common bonds. Their initiatives included the restoration of the tribal cemetery on Government Hill and aggressive lobbying of Congress and the office of the President to again recognize Siletz as a federal Native American tribe.

In June 1974, Rep. Wendell Wyatt introduced a first restoration bill, but it did not pass.

On December 17, 1975, Senator Mark Hatfield introduced restoration bill S. 2801. At the time Senator Hatfield presented his restoration bill he was quoted as saying that the Siletz People were "ill-prepared to cope with the realities of American society" when the Termination act went to effect and that they had been "tossed abruptly from a state of almost total dependency to a state of total independence ...[forcing them] to leave the only way of life they had known." The bill included wording to grant or restore hunting and fishing rights. This bill also did not pass.

Senator Hatfield and Senator Bob Packwood introduced a new bill, S. 1560, in the month of May 1977. Unlike its 1975 predecessor, it did not include that the hunting or fishing rights be restored (although a companion bill was sent by Rep. Les AuCoin to the United States House of Representatives, H.R. 7259, which the Oregon Fish and Wildlife Commission fought and helped to stall). On August 5, 1977, the United States Senate passed the restoration bill and on November 1, 1977, so did the House. The bill was then sent to President Jimmy Carter on November 3 and then signed into law on November 18, 1977.

Today about 5,600 of their descendants are enrolled members of this tribe, which is based on the Siletz Reservation along the Siletz River in the Central Oregon Coast Range, about 15 miles northeast of Newport, Oregon.

Important events in tribal history

On November 18, 1977, the Confederated Tribes became the second tribe in the U.S. to have its federal status restored, and returned to being a sovereign government.
On June 2, 1979, tribal members adopted a constitution.
The tribe had given this land to the city at the time of termination.
In 1980, the Siletz Reservation Act was signed into law, returning about 3,660 acres to the Siletz Tribe as its initial restored Siletz Reservation. 
In 1994, the Tribe voted to lower the blood quantum, to 1/16, which allowed new members to join.
In 1995, the first "Run to the Rogue" took place, in which tribal members took turns carrying an eagle flag staff from Government Hill in Siletz to Agness, Oregon (located on the Rogue River) in what is Oregon's longest relay on foot.
In 1995, the Siletz Tribe opened up a  casino/convention center, called Chinook Winds Casino, which overlooks the Pacific Ocean from Lincoln City, Oregon.
In 2005, a 227-room hotel adjacent to Chinook Winds Casino was purchased and added to the casino.
December 6, 2016 S.817 Bill Passed in U.S. House of Representatives. Real Property located within the original Siletz Reservation boundaries lines is now deemed "on reservation."

Organization and location

The Confederated Tribes have 5,600 enrolled members, 70% of whom live in Oregon and only 8% of whom live near on the  reservation. An additional 6% live in the town of Siletz and 22.6% live in Lincoln County. There are 445 households in the city of Siletz and 143 households on the Siletz Reservation.

The Confederated Tribes of Siletz Indians became the second tribe terminated by an act of Congress to regain federal recognition by passage of the Siletz Restoration Act Nov 18, 1977.

The tribe owns and operates the Chinook Winds Casino and Convention Center, the Chinook Winds Golf Resort in Lincoln City (including the Chinook Winds Resort hotel purchased from Shilo Inn hotels in 2004), the oceanfront Lot 57 north of Chinook Winds Casino, Hee Hee Illahee RV park in Salem, the Logan Road RV Park, the Salem Flex Building where the Salem Area Offices currently exist, the Portland Stark Building which was purchased in August 2007, which is the site of the tribe's Portland Area Office, the Eugene Elks building which houses the Eugene Area Office, the Siletz Gas & Mini Mart, the old Toledo Mill site, and a commercial building in Depoe Bay.

The tribe also owns and runs the Siletz Community Health Clinic. A $7.5 million plan is underway to expand the clinic.  $2 million of the funding will come from the Federal government's IHS Small Ambulatory Grant funding.

The Siletz Tribal Police department was discontinued, but the tribe now contracts with the nearby Lincoln County Sheriff's Office to provide law enforcement services to the Siletz area.

The tribe is gradually accumulating additional property into the reservation, as part of its Comprehensive Plan. This includes  entrusted to the tribe in 2007 by the state and federal governments as part of the New Carissa oil spill settlement, on the condition that the Confederated Tribes will manage it as a marbled murrelet habitat.

The tribal government is attempting to get its 1850's treaties with the United States recognized by referencing them in the tribe's constitution, and also by mentioning the treaties in a work by Charles Wilkinson, who was hired by the Tribal Council to write a history of the Siletz.  There have also been attempts to retrieve the remains of tribal ancestors from the Smithsonian Institution, and to retrieve various other tribal artifacts distributed throughout the United States of America.

The current Tribal Council includes Chairman Delores Pigsley, Vice Chairman Bud Lane, Secretary Sharon Edenfield, Treasurer Robert Kentta, Reggie Butler, Sr., Lillie Butler, Loraine Butler, Angela Ramirez and Selene Rilatos.

The tribal government's Public Information Office publishes the monthly Siletz News.

Cultural activities
Artifacts and historical documents are stored and displayed at the Siletz Tribal Cultural Center, located on Government Hill, under the care of Cultural Programs Staff.

Tolowa is taught as a common tribal language. Beginning Athabaskan language has been taught at the Siletz Valley Charter School, which opened in the fall of 2006.

The second weekend in August of every year the tribe is host to its annual Nesika Illahee Pow-wow.

Every summer and winter solstice for hundreds if not thousands of years, a dance has been held, called the Feather Dance (or Nee-dash), for 10 nights.

In recent years a new tradition has been started. During the winter solstice, dancers, singers, and tribal members from the Confederated Tribes visit the Tolowa's cedar plank dance house near Smith River, California. During the summer solstice, dancers, singers, and tribal members of the Tolowa tribe visit the peoples of the Confederated Tribes of Siletz's cedar plank dance house.

Population
Finding records of the ethnic and cultural history of the Confederated Tribes of Siletz is somewhat difficult. A partial attempt at the tribal population makeup before it was forced on reservation lands in the mid-19th century is as follows:

Upper Rogue River or Shasta Tribe:
John's Band           172
George's Band         222
Joseph James's Band   160
Coastal Tribes:
Joshuas's Band        179
Choallie's Band       215
Totoem's Band         202
Macanotin's Band      129
Shasta Costa 110
Port Orford (a Qua-to-mah band) 242
Upper Coquille 313

Language
The ancestors of the Confederated Tribes spoke at least 11 different languages.

 Salishan languages
 Tillamook
 Shastan languages 
 Shasta
 Penutian languages (proposed grouping)
 Chinookan languages
 Lower Chinook
 Kalapuyan languages
 Takelma
 Plateau Penutian languages
 Sahaptian languages
 Sahaptin (Klickitat dialect)
 Molala 
 Coast Oregon Penutian languages (proposed)
 Alsea
 Siuslaw 
 Coosan languages
 Na-Dene languages
 Athabaskan languages
 Lower Rogue River (or Tututni)
 Upper Rogue River (or Galice-Applegate)
 Upper Umpqua (or Etnemitane)
 Tolowa (or Siletz Dee-ni)

According to a report by the National Geographic Society and the Living Tongues Institute for Endangered Languages, Siletz Dee-ni is the last of many tribal languages spoken on the reservation. In 2007 only one living fluent speaker remained. However, according to a later report in The Economist, the language has since been at least partially revived thanks to an on-line dictionary project; in some areas, "many now text each other in Siletz Dee-ni." The tribe has a language revival program with classes in three area offices and Siletz Valley school.  As of 2020, a number of younger conversant speakers have learned the language.

Notable Siletz people
 Peter "Last Walking Bear" DePoe, drummer for the band Redbone.
 Sister Francella Mary Griggs, advocate for the restoration of federal recognition
 Mary "Dolly" Fisher, activist to restore federal recognition of the Confederated Tribes of Siletz Indians from 1974. She won the Nanwood Honeyman Award for significant contribution to the advancement of women in Oregon. She won The National Congress of American Indians award, honoring Indian and Native Women's leadership. Named tribal casino as "Chinook Winds." 
 Calvin Leroy Van Pelt (1924–2011), businessman and tribal elder
 Delores Ann (Lane) Pigsley, one of the longest serving Tribal leaders in the United States as of 2020, still serving as Siletz Tribal Chairman.

See also
List of Native American Tribal Entities in Oregon

References

Further reading

External links
 Confederated Tribes of Siletz Indians (official website)
 Tolowa resources
 25 U.S.C. 771 et seq. "Siletz Indian Tribe"
 
 Kentta, Robert. "A Siletz Historical Timeline". Siletz Indian Tribe History, Tillamook Oregon, Multnomah County Oregon, Salishan - Part I - Introduction. STBC, n.d. Web. 13 Oct. 2016.

 
Native American tribes in California
Native American tribes in Oregon
Federally recognized tribes in the United States
Rogue River Wars